Waldemar Wappenhans (21 October 1893 - 2 December 1967) was an SS-Gruppenführer and Generalleutnant of police who served as an SS and police leader (SSPF) in the Reichskommissariat Ukraine.

Early years
Wappenhans was born in Berlin the son of a professor, attended a cadet school in Karlsruhe from 1902 and then the Prussian Military Academy in Lichterfelde. In July 1914, he was commissioned a Leutnant in the Imperial German Army.

At the outbreak of the First World War, Wappenhans was a member of the 113th Infantry Regiment and from September 1914 he became a battalion adjutant in the 239th Infantry Regiment. He was wounded, and after release from the hospital, he transferred to the Imperial German Air Force. He qualified as a pilot, served in Flying Detachments 300 and 305 and was awarded the Iron Cross, 1st and 2nd class. After the end of the war, Wappenhans was employed by the border service in Silesia and left the army in 1923 with the rank of Oberleutnant. He attended the University of Breslau and then worked for a cigarette company, becoming a branch manager in Danzig. In 1930, through Werner Lorenz, Wappenhans became acquainted with Reichsführer-SS Heinrich Himmler. He subsequently joined the Nazi Party (membership number 465,090) and the SS (membership number 22,924) on 1 February 1931.

SS peacetime career
Wappenhans was then assigned to SS-Abschnitt (District) VII in Danzig, and became its Chief of Staff from February to September 1932. From September 1932 to April 1933, he was Commander of the 19th SS-Standarte "Westphalia-North" based in Münster. After the Nazi seizure of power, he was elected to the Prussian Landtag in March 1933, where he served until its dissolution. From April to December 1933, he was commander of the 55th SS-Standarte "Weser" in Nieburg, and from then until the end of October 1934 commander of the 24th SS-Standarte "Ostfriesland" in Oldenburg. This was followed by a posting as a special duty officer in the SS-Oberabschnitt (Main District)  "Nordost" in Königsberg. In April 1935 he became commander of SS-Abschnitt IX in Würzburg. Leaving this post in April 1938, he commanded SS-Abschnitt XVII in Augsburg until May 1938. He was then made Chief of Staff for SS-Oberabschnitt "Nord" in Stettin until November of 1938, before taking command of SS-Abschnitt XXXIII in Schwerin until September 1941.

Second World War 
In January 1936, Wappenhans had entered the Luftwaffe as a Leutnant of the reserves. He would serve with aerial reconnaissance units until December 1940, leaving the service as a Major of reserves.  He completed police training courses at Ordnungspolizei headquarters in Berlin, where he worked until September 1941. Following the German invasion of the Soviet Union, he held a number of SS and Police Leader (SSPF) posts in the Reichskommissariat Ukraine (RKU). In these posts, he commanded all German uniformed police, as well as all SS and Sicherheitsdienst (SD) forces in his jurisdictions. From September 1941 through August 1942 he was SSPF in Wolhynien-Brest-Litovsk, adding in January 1942 Rovno to his jurisdiction. From August 1942 until April 1943 he was SSPF in Nikolayev, and also from October 1942 to October 1943, SSPF in Dnjepropetrowsk-Krivoi Rog. Throughout Wappenhans' tenure in the RKU, SS and Order Police battalions together with Einsatzgruppen personnel were engaged in mass murder of the Jewish population.

From October 1943, Wappenhans was an SSPF for special assignment to the Supreme SS and Police Leader (HöSSPF) "Ukraine," Hans-Adolf Prützmann, and was commander of a Kampfgruppe (battle group) until January 1944. After that he was placed on medical leave due to illness. In January 1945, Wappenhans was transferred to the staff of Generalfeldmarschall Walter Model on the western front. Towards the very end of the war he received orders to report to Berlin but, unable to reach the encircled city, instead made his way to Hahnenklee, where his family lived.

Postwar life
Wappenhaus went underground under the false name "Hans Seemann," working as a farm hand, and then as a property management administrator for the British occupation authorities in Hanover. At the time, Wappenhans was reported to be the fourth highest Nazi on the Allies "most-wanted" list. In November 1949, his true identity was discovered by Wolfe Frank, a reporter for the New York Herald Tribune who had served as the chief interpreter at the Nuremberg trials. He was interrogated and signed a statement, but denied all involvement in criminal acts. He underwent a denazification process in Bielefeld but was not brought to criminal trial.

Military, SS and police ranks

See also
The Holocaust in Ukraine

References

Sources

Further reading

1893 births
1967 deaths
German World War I pilots
Holocaust perpetrators in Russia
Luftstreitkräfte personnel
Luftwaffe personnel of World War II
Nazi Party members
People from Berlin
Recipients of the Iron Cross (1914), 1st class
Recipients of the Iron Cross (1914), 2nd class
Recipients of the War Merit Cross
Reichswehr personnel
SS and Police Leaders
SS-Gruppenführer
University of Breslau alumni